Corby Hill is a village in Cumbria, England. The Trout Beck stream passes here.

The village forms part of a small urban area which also includes the villages of Warwick Bridge and Little Corby. Corby Hill and Little Corby are in Hayton civil parish while Warwick Bridge is in the parish of Wetheral.

There is a BP petrol filling station with a SPAR foodstore attached and also a doctors surgery.

See also
List of places in Cumbria

References

External links
Search for sources in google books

Villages in Cumbria
Hayton, Carlisle